Šent Jurij (commonly abbreviated as Št. Jurij) is a village in the Municipality of Grosuplje in central Slovenia. The area is part of the historical region of Lower Carniola. The municipality is now included in the Central Slovenia Statistical Region.

Name
The name of the settlement was changed from Sveti Jurij pri Grosupljem (literally, 'Saint George near Grosuplje') to Podtabor pri Grosupljem (literally, 'below the fort near Grosuplje') in 1952. The name was changed on the basis of the 1948 Law on Names of Settlements and Designations of Squares, Streets, and Buildings as part of efforts by Slovenia's postwar communist government to remove religious elements from toponyms. The name was restored as Šent Jurij in 1992.

Church

The parish church from which the settlement gets its name is dedicated to Saint George and belongs to the Roman Catholic Archdiocese of Ljubljana. It is a Gothic building that was restyled and rebuilt in 18th and 19th centuries.

References

External links

Sveti Jurij on Geopedia

Populated places in the Municipality of Grosuplje